Michel Valsan (1 February 1907, Brăila, Kingdom of Romania – 25/26 November 1974, Antony, Hauts-de-Seine) was a Muslim scholar and master of a Shadhiliyya tariqah in Paris under the name Shaykh Mustafa 'Abd al-'Aziz. As well, he was a Romanian diplomat and a prolific translator who specialized in translating and interpreting the works of the Sufi theoretician Ibn Arabi.

A follower of René Guénon, Valsan considered Hinduism, Taoism and Islam as "the three main forms of the present traditional world, representing the Middle-East, the Far-East, and the Near-East, as reflections of the three aspects of the Lord of the World."

Valsan introduced the study of Islamic esoteric doctrine, in particular that of Ibn Arabi and his school, into the context of the "traditional studies" based around the work of René Guénon (Shaykh 'Abd al-Wahid Yahya), of which he was a constant and effective defender. Although initially a disciple of Frithjof Schuon, he later distanced himself from Schuon and the Traditionalist School, declaring his independence in 1950.

Valsan served as the director and editor of, and regular contributor to, the journal Etudes Traditionnelles from 1948 until his death in 1974.  Valsan died in Paris, France at the age of 63.  A collection of his articles was republished in a posthumous compendium entitled L'Islam et la Fonction de René Guénon (Editions de l'Oeuvre, Paris).

References

External links
Complete bibliography
"Notes on the Shaikh al-‘Alawi", an essay by Michel Vâlsan
Mise en ligne des écrits de Michel Vâlsan par la revue Science sacrée

French Sufis
1911 births
1974 deaths
Traditionalist School
Romanian diplomats
Romanian scholars
Translators from Arabic
Arabic–French translators
20th-century translators
French Arabists
Ibn Arabi scholars